Tvååkers IF is a Swedish football club located in Tvååker in Varberg Municipality, Halland County.

Background
Since their foundation in 1920 Tvååkers IF has participated mainly in the middle and lower divisions of the Swedish football league system.  The club currently plays in Division 1 which is the third tier of Swedish football. They play their home matches at Övrevi IP football ground in Tvååker.

Tvååkers IF are affiliated to the Hallands Fotbollförbund.

Season to season

Attendances

In recent seasons Tvååkers IF have had the following average attendances:

Footnotes

External links
 Tvååkers IF – Official website
 Tvååkers IF Facebook

Football clubs in Halland County
Association football clubs established in 1920
1920 establishments in Sweden